Fernando de Mendonça (born December 2, 1924 in Guaramiranga, Ceará) is a Brazilian electronic engineer and researcher, founder and first director of Brazil's National Institute for Space Research.

Career
Mendonça graduated in Electronic Engineering at the Instituto Tecnológico de Aeronáutica (ITA) in 1958. After, he received his PhD in Radio sciences from Stanford University, in the USA.

During his period in the United States, Mendonça established contacts with NASA in the name of the Brazilian government, contacts that played an important role in the later development of the Brazilian Space Program.

After his return to Brazil, he was nominated by President Jânio Quadros to take part in the preliminary committee in charge of the studies for the deployment of the national space program. When the National Institute for Space Research (INPE) was founded in 1971, Mendonça became its first Director.

References

External links
 Organization and structure of a national system of scientific and technological information - UNESCO (page 8)

1924 births
Living people
Brazilian scientists